The Anuario Colombiano de Historia Social y de la Cultura, founded in 1963 by Jaime Jaramillo Uribe, is the academic journal of the Department of History of the National University of Colombia. It is funded by the Faculty of Human Sciences at the university's headquarters in Bogotá. Although it mainly publishes research on Colombian history, it also accepts research on Latin American and world history, as well as historiography. It has been recognised as the main publication of Colombian historical studies. Authors are national and international scholars.

The journal currently publishes two issues annually. Its editor is Max S. Hering Torres.

References

Quotations from sources

National University of Colombia academic journals
Biannual journals
History journals
Cultural journals
Colombian culture
Mass media in Bogotá
Publications established in 1963